The women's 100 metres (T38) at the 2018 Commonwealth Games, as part of the athletics programme, took place in the Carrara Stadium on 12 April 2018. The event was open to para-sport athletes competing under the T37 / T38 classifications.

Records
Prior to this competition, the existing world and Games records were as follows:

Schedule
The schedule was as follows:

All times are Australian Eastern Standard Time (UTC+10)

Results
With six entrants, the event was held as a straight final.

Final

References

Women's 100 metres (T38)
2018 in women's athletics